Max Havelaar is an 1860 Dutch novel written by Multatuli.

Max Havelaar may also refer to:
Max Havelaar, a character from the novel Max Havelaar
Max Havelaar (film), a 1976 Dutch film adaption of the novel Max Havelaar
Stichting Max Havelaar, a Dutch Fairtrade organisation
Association Max Havelaar France, a French Fairtrade organisation
Max Havelaar-Stiftung (Schweiz), a Swiss Fairtrade organisation
Max Havelaar label or International Fairtrade Certification Mark, a trade certification mark of FLO International